The Americas Zone was one of three zones of regional competition in the 1997 Fed Cup.

Group I
Venue: Colombian Tennis Academy, Bogotá, Colombia (outdoor clay)
Date: 29 April – 4 May

The nine teams were divided into one pool of five and one pool of four teams. The top two teams from each pool then moved on to the play-off stage of the competition. The four teams that won one match from the play-off stage would advance to Group I for 1998.

Pools

Knockout stage

  advanced to World Group II Play-offs.
  and  relegated to Group II in 1998.

Group II
 Venue: Casa de Campo, Santo Domingo, Dominican Republic (outdoor clay)
 Date: 12–18 May

The fifteen teams were divided into two pools of seven and eight. The top team from each pool then moved would advance to Group I for 1998.

Pools

  and  advanced to Group I in 1998.

See also
Fed Cup structure

References

 Fed Cup Profile, Canada
 Fed Cup Profile, Brazil
 Fed Cup Profile, Ecuador
 Fed Cup Profile, Colombia
 Fed Cup Profile, Peru
 Fed Cup Profile, Chile
 Fed Cup Profile, Venezuela
 Fed Cup Profile, Paraguay
 Fed Cup Profile, Dominican Republic
 Fed Cup Profile, Trinidad and Tobago
 Fed Cup Profile, Panama
 Fed Cup Profile, Guatemala
 Fed Cup Profile, Bahamas
 Fed Cup Profile, Uruguay
 Fed Cup Profile, Cuba
 Fed Cup Profile, Jamaica
 Fed Cup Profile, Bolivia
 Fed Cup Profile, Costa Rica
 Fed Cup Profile, El Salvador
 Fed Cup Profile, Bermuda

External links
 Fed Cup website

 
Americas
Sport in Bogotá
Tennis tournaments in Colombia
Sport in Santo Domingo
Tennis tournaments in the Dominican Republic
1997 in Colombian tennis